Dariusz Śledź (born 15 September 1969) is a former motorcycle speedway rider from Poland, who rode in the 1995 Speedway Grand Prix of Poland. Śledź won the Polish league three times. In February 2009 he was appointed coach of the speedway club Stal Rzeszów, after previously managing the WTS Atlas team. In 2019 he became a manager of Sparta Wroclaw.

Speedway Grand Prix results

Career details

World Championships 

 Individual World Championship (Speedway Grand Prix)
 1994 - 13th place in World Semi Final 2
 1995 - 22nd place (7 points in three event)
 Team World Championship (Speedway World Team Cup)
 1990 - 4th place in Group B
 1991 - 3rd place in Group C
 1993 - 3rd place in Group A
 1994 -  Broksted - Runner-up (0 points)
 Individual U-21 World Championship
 1990 -  Lviv - 12th place (5 points)

See also 
 Poland national speedway team
 List of Speedway Grand Prix riders
 Speedway in Poland

References 

Polish speedway riders
1969 births
Living people
Sportspeople from Lublin